Benjamin Wilson (11 November 1870 – 22 September 1929) was a New Zealand cricketer. He played in one first-class match for Wellington in 1892/93.

See also
 List of Wellington representative cricketers

References

External links
 

1870 births
1929 deaths
New Zealand cricketers
Wellington cricketers
Cricketers from Waikato